Big Bar may refer to:
Big Bar Ferry, on the Fraser River, British Columbia, Canada
Big Bar Heliport
Big Bar Lake Provincial Park, British Columbia, Canada
Big Bar, Butte County, California
Big Bar, Trinity County, California
Pulga, California, formerly Big Bar